Costică Bărăgan (born 2 May 1949) is a Romanian fencer. He competed at the 1972 and 1980 Summer Olympics.

References

1949 births
Living people
Romanian male fencers
Romanian épée fencers
Olympic fencers of Romania
Fencers at the 1972 Summer Olympics
Fencers at the 1980 Summer Olympics
Sportspeople from Bucharest